Serdyuki is a rural locality (a village) in Malinovsky Selsoviet, Belebeyevsky District, Bashkortostan, Russia. The population was 2 as of 2010. There is one street.

Geography 
Serdyuki is located 14 km south of Belebey (the district's administrative centre) by road. Yangi-Kyuch is the nearest rural locality.

References 

Rural localities in Belebeyevsky District